The  is a river which flows through the city of Kani in Gifu Prefecture, Japan. It is part of the Kiso River system.

Geography
The river originates in the Kukuri neighborhood in eastern Kani. It flows westward to the Kani River.

On the upper part of the river is the Kobuchi Dam, which was the first rock-filled dam built in Japan.

References

Rivers of Gifu Prefecture
Rivers of Japan